Benjamina may refer to:

 Benjamina (name), female name
 976 Benjamina, a dark background asteroid